Greatest Hits II is a 2001 compilation album by country singer Clint Black. It was his last release for RCA Nashville.

Like his first Greatest Hits volume, it compiles 12 hit songs from his previous albums and adds four new recordings: the romantic duet "Easy for Me to Say" (his second duet with wife Lisa Hartman Black), "Little Pearl and Lily's Lullaby" (a song for their then-newborn daughter), the country-rocker "Money or Love", and a newly recorded "blues version" of "Put Yourself in My Shoes". Also included is the long version of Black's 1997 duet with Martina McBride, "Still Holding On", which was the B-side of that single.

Track listing 
All songs written by Clint Black and Hayden Nicholas except where noted.

Personnel
 Clint Black – classical guitar, electric guitar, lead vocals, background vocals
 Lily Pearl Black – animal sounds
 Lisa Hartman Black – vocals on "When I Said I Do" and "Easy for Me to Say"
 Lenny Castro – percussion
 Steve Dorff – string arrangements, conductor
 Wendell Kelly – Tenor and Bass trombone
 Randy Kerber – music box, piano
 Abe Laboriel Sr. – bass guitar
 Martina McBride – vocals on "Still Holding On"
 Hayden Nicholas – electric guitar
 Dean Parks – acoustic guitar
 Thomas R. Peterson – saxophone
 Steve Real – background vocals
 John "J.R." Robinson – drums
 Matt Rollings – piano, Wurlitzer
 Leland Sklar – bass guitar
 Shari Sutcliffe – string contractor
 Lee Thornburg – horn arrangements, trumpet
 Steve Wariner – acoustic guitar and vocals on "Been There"

Chart performance

Weekly charts

Year-end charts

Singles

References 

Black Tracks: Greatest Hits II. ClintBlack.com. Retrieved on January 5, 2007.
[ Greatest Hits II Overview]. Allmusic. Retrieved on January 5, 2007.
[ Artist Chart History (Singles)]. Billboard. Retrieved on January 3, 2007.
[ Artist Chart History (Albums)]. Billboard. Retrieved on January 3, 2007.

2001 greatest hits albums
Clint Black compilation albums
RCA Records compilation albums
Albums produced by James Stroud